Keasius is an extinct genus of basking sharks that lived during the Cenozoic. It contains four valid species, which have been found in North America, Europe, and Antarctica.

References

Cetorhinidae
Prehistoric shark genera